Nicola Capellini (born 24 February 1991) is an Italian football midfielder who plays for Cesena.

Career
On 31 August 2012 Capellini left for San Marino Calcio in a temporary deal.

On 13 June 2013 Capellini was re-signed by A.C. Cesena in a 3-year deal. On 3 January 2014 he was signed by Venezia in another temporary deal.

On 12 July 2014 he was signed by Forlì in another temporary deal.

On 16 July 2015 he signed a one-year deal, with option for a 2nd year, with Andria.

In the summer 2016 he signed for Forlì.

In July 2019 he signed with Cesena and helped them achieve promotion to Serie C.

References

External links
 
 

1991 births
Living people
Italian footballers
Association football midfielders
A.C. Cesena players
Venezia F.C. players
S.S. Fidelis Andria 1928 players
Serie B players
Serie C players
Serie D players